Emperor Michael may refer to:

 Nine Byzantine emperors
 Michael I Rangabe (r. 811–813)
 Michael II the Stammerer (r. 820–829)
 Michael III the Drunkard (r. 842–867)
 Michael IV the Paphlagonian (r. 1034–1041)
 Michael V the Caulker (r. 1041–1042)
 Michael VI Bringas "Stratiotikos" (r. 1056–1057)
 Michael VII Doukas "Parapinakes" (r. 1071–1078)
 Michael VIII Palaiologos (r. 1261–1282)
 Michael IX Palaiologos (r. 1294–1320)
 Michael II Asen (r. 1246–1256), tsar of Bulgaria
 Michael III Shishman (r. 1323–1330), tsar of Bulgaria
 Michael Romanov (r. 1596–1645), tsar of Russia